Androlaelaps schaeferi (formerly known as Gromphadorholaelaps schaeferi) is a mite that lives on the Madagascar hissing cockroach (Gromphadorhina portentosa). While it was formerly believed that it sucks body fluid from its host, coloring experiments have shown that this is false. Instead, it takes part in its host's meal. They are usually concentrated between the host's legs and around the spiracles.

References

External links
 Joel Hallan Biology Catalog: Laelapidae
 Yoder, J.A. & Barcelona, J.C. Jr. (1995). Food and water resources used by the Madagascan hissing-cockroach mite, Gromphadorholaelaps schaeferi. Experimental and Applied Acarology 19(5):259-273. 

Laelapidae
Animals described in 1969
Arthropods of Madagascar